List of maritime music festivals is a sortable incomplete list of regularly occurring festivals, throughout the world, which feature or which usually contain significant performances of maritime music, a style of folk music largely based on the sea shanty. This list may have some overlap with list of folk festivals and list of early music festivals.

Shanties had antecedents in the working chants of British and other national maritime traditions. They were notably influenced by songs of shanty repertoire borrowed from the contemporary popular music enjoyed by sailors, including minstrel music, popular marches, and land-based folk songs. The music has since appeared at early folk festivals, and by the late 1970s, the activities of enthusiasts and scholar-performers at places like the Mystic Seaport Museum (who initiated an annual Sea Music Festival in 1979) and the San Francisco Maritime Museum established sea music—inclusive of shanties, sea songs, and other maritime music—as a genre with its own circuit of festivals, record labels, performance protocol, and so on. Some of the performances may be held at maritime museums, in conjunction with boat shows or maritime festivals, or at other venues friendly to acoustic music.

The performances at festivals can take several forms, as shanty performances today reflect a range of musical approaches and tastes. There are performers who favor a "traditional" style, who often perform work songs a capella or only with light instrumentation typical of sailors (e.g. concertina). A great many of the performers of shanties do so in what might be distinguished as a "folk music" style, often accompanied by guitar and banjo. Still other performers come to shanties from backgrounds in pop, rock, or theatrical music, and perform in what may be called a "contemporary" style. Some shanties are performed in a "classical" choir style (like the Robert Shaw Chorale).

Related lists and categories

The following lists may have some overlap: 
 List of music festivals
List of folk festivals
List of early music festivals
 List of Celtic festivals

The following categories are related:
:Category:Music festivals
:Category:Maritime music festivals
:Category:Maritime music
:Category:Folk festivals

Festivals by location

Festivals by date
The following table is a selection of the European event calendar remso.eu - Shanty- festivals with more than 4 performers (groups) only. All reported festival-events up from 3 groups you can find here: 2015, 2016, 2017, 2018, 2019, 2020. Click on date below to watch participants of that event and listen to some of their songs.

Outdated

Gallery

See also

Sea shanty
List of music festivals
List of folk festivals
List of maritime music performers
List of maritime museums in the United States

References

External links
Hart Backbord contains a comprehensive list of forthcoming festivals across the world.
The Bitter End contains a comprehensive list of forthcoming festivals across the world.
shantyfreun.de list of european shanty-choirs and groups.
The Event Calendar remso.eu contains a user-edited list of forthcoming maritime music events in Europe, some with audio and video included.

Lists of classical music festivals

Lists of folk festivals